Bishopton Castle was a medieval castle in Bishopton village, County Durham, England. The surviving motte is a Scheduled Ancient Monument.

Details

Bishopton Castle was built by Roger de Conyers in 1143, in the village of Bishopton, near to the town of Darlington. Constructed in a motte-and-bailey design, the castle had two baileys, rather than the usual one, and originally had two large enclosures beyond the baileys. In the 12th century it was surrounded by a low artificial lake, fed by the brook to the west, and could only be accessed by causeways.

De Conyers built the castle during a dispute with William Cumin, who laid claim to be the Bishop of Durham; de Conyers supported Cumin's rival, William of St. Barbara. Historian Lise Hull believes that the licence to crenellate given to de Conyers for his castle may be the first recorded instance of this in England, but Philip Davis rejects the licence on the grounds that the fortification was a matter of necessity rather than consent, and that the supposed licence contains no indicative wording.

In later years the castle became owned directly by the Bishop of Durham, a powerful regional landowner.

The mound was one of twenty investigated by the Round Mounds Project during 2015 and 2016, looking for possible pre-historic mounds that had been re-used as Norman motts. A 10cm diameter core sample was taken, running from the top of the mound down to below the original ground level, with Radiocarbon dating of the buried material. The great majority of the mounds investigated confirmed a Norman construction, with no sign of a previous earthwork. This was the case at the Bishopton mound, where a Norman date was confirmed. It also identified that the raised causeway on the north side was a secondary feature, which had not been part of the original construction.

See also
Castles in Great Britain and Ireland
List of castles in England

References

Bibliography
Brickstock, Richard. (2007) Castle: Fortress, Palace, College. Durham: Jeremy Mills Publishing. .
Creighton, Oliver Hamilton. (2005) Castles and Landscapes: Power, Community and Fortification in Medieval England. London: Equinox. .
Hull, Lise E. (2006) Britain's Medieval Castles. Westport: Praeger. .
Hull, Lise E. (2009) Understanding the Castle Ruins of England and Wales: How to Interpret the History and Meaning of Masonry and Earthworks. Jefferson, US: MacFarland. .
Pettifer, Adrian. (2002) English Castles: a Guide by Counties. Woodbridge, UK: Boydell Press. .

Castles in County Durham
Buildings and structures in the Borough of Darlington